State Committee for Scientific Research in Poland (Polish: Komitet Badań Naukowych - KBN) was an organisational unit operating 1991 to 2005 as the supreme authority within the Ministry of Science and Higher Education regarding State policy in the field of science and technology.

One of its major tasks was distribution of funds for scientific research among Polish universities, research institutes and other scientific institutions.

In 2005, it was closed and replaced by the Science Council, and in 2010 by National Centre for Research and Development.

External links
Komitet Badań Naukowych - archive homepage in English (accessed 2015.03.17)
Act from 30 April 2010 reorganising the scientific institutions in Poland

1991 establishments in Poland
2005 disestablishments in Poland
Government agencies established in 1991
Government agencies of Poland
Organisations based in Warsaw
Science and technology in Poland